The Nun  (stylized as †HE NUИ) is a 2018 American gothic supernatural horror film directed by Corin Hardy and written by Gary Dauberman, from a story by Dauberman and James Wan. It is a spin-off/prequel of 2016's The Conjuring 2 and the fifth installment in The Conjuring Universe franchise. The film stars Taissa Farmiga, Demián Bichir and Jonas Bloquet, with Bonnie Aarons reprising her role as the Demon Nun, an incarnation of Valak, from The Conjuring 2. The plot follows a Roman Catholic priest and a nun in her novitiate as they uncover an unholy secret in 1952 Romania.

Warner Bros. Pictures and New Line Cinema announced The Nun, a spin-off film to The Conjuring 2, which had opened five days earlier, with Safran and Wan producing. The initial script for the film was written by David Leslie Johnson. Hardy had signed on to direct The Nun with a new screenplay from Wan and Dauberman. Principal photography began in May 2017 in Bucharest, Romania, and during filming, the set was blessed by an Eastern Orthodox priest.

The Nun was released in the United States on September 7, 2018, by Warner Bros. Pictures. Critics praised its performances and atmosphere, but criticized its weak narrative and inconsistent logic. It grossed $365million worldwide, becoming the highest-grossing film of the series. A sequel, The Nun 2, is currently in production with Michael Chaves directing and James Wan and Peter Safran co-producing.

Plot

In 1952 Romania, two nuns living at the Saint Cartha's monastery are attacked by an unseen evil force after one of them entered a tunnel to retrieve an ancient Christian relic. The surviving nun, Sister Victoria, flees from the attacker, a demon appearing as a nun, and hangs herself. Her body is discovered by Frenchie, a villager who transports supplies to the nuns.

The Vatican learns of the incident and summons Father Burke to Rome, where they ask him to travel with Sister Irene, a nun in her novitiate, to Romania in order to investigate the situation. While Sister Irene is teaching children the relationship between religion and science in a school, her Mother Superior interrupts her and informs her that Burke has arrived in order to request Irene's accompaniment in his trip to Romania.

The pair travels to Romania and meets with Frenchie, who leads them to the abbey. They discover Victoria's body and take a key from her corpse. Inside, they encounter the Abbess, who informs them that the nuns observe a period of silence during the night and offers them lodging at the attached convent if they wish to return tomorrow. Frenchie is attacked by a demon as he returns to the village, but escapes. Burke tells Irene that a boy he exorcised in the past, Daniel, was fatally injured during the ritual, and Burke has carried the burden of the boy's death. Irene reveals that as a girl, she had visions and each of them concluded with "Mary points the way", causing the Church to take an interest in her. That night, Burke is rescued by Irene after being buried alive in the graveyard by the demonic entity.

The next day, Irene and Burke return to the abbey, but only Irene can enter as it is cloistered. She meets some of the other nuns and learns that they are praying constantly, swapping in shifts, to keep the entity at bay. Sister Oana reveals the abbey was built in the Middle Ages as a castle to be used by the Duke of St. Carta, a powerful aristocrat obsessed with the occult. The duke summoned the demon through a rift in the catacombs but was killed by Christian knights, who sealed the rift with a vial filled with the Blood of Christ. However, the bombings during World War II reopened the rift, unleashing the entity. Burke identifies the demon as Valak and discovers the Abbess has been dead all along.

Frenchie heads back to the abbey to help Irene and Burke. Irene is attacked by Valak and joins the nuns in desperate prayer to ward off the demon. When the group reunites, Irene discovers that none of the nuns she had seen and talked to were real and she had been praying alone, later realizing that Sister Victoria had been the last nun in the abbey and had sacrificed herself to stop Valak from possessing her body and unleashing evil.

Theorizing that Valak can only be stopped if they seal the rift with the blood of Christ contained in the reliquary, the trio retrieves the vial with the key Victoria possessed. Irene informs Burke that God has called her to make her solemn vows as a nun and asks Burke to elevate her to the status of a professed nun, which he does in the abbey's chapel.

After the trio unlocks the tunnel door, Irene is lured into a pentagram and possessed by Valak. Frenchie smears some of the blood of Christ on her face, casting out the demon. Burke is wounded by Daniel's ghost as Valak starts to drown Irene in a flooded chamber. Irene expels the blood of Christ in the demon's face, banishing it as the rift is sealed. After Frenchie resuscitates Irene, he reveals his name is Maurice. Unbeknownst to the others, Maurice has been possessed by Valak, as evidenced by an inverted crucifix on the back of his neck.

Twenty years later at a university seminar in Wakefield, Massachusetts, Carolyn Perron watches as Ed and Lorraine Warren present footage of their attempt to exorcise a possessed Maurice. In the footage, Maurice grabs Lorraine, giving her visions of Ed dying, causing her to scream in horror and lock herself in her bedroom for eight days, which initiates the Warrens' investigation of the Perron farmhouse haunting.

Cast

Additionally, Patrick Wilson, Vera Farmiga, Christof Veillon, Lili Taylor and Shannon Kook appear in archive footage from The Conjuring as Ed and Lorraine Warren, the older Maurice Theriault, Carolyn Perron and Drew Thomas respectively.
Sterling Jerins appears in archive footage from The Conjuring 2 as Judy Warren.

Production

Development
On June 15, 2016, Warner Bros. Pictures and New Line Cinema announced The Nun, a spin-off film to The Conjuring 2, which had opened five days earlier. Peter Safran and James Wan produced. The initial script for the film was written by David Leslie Johnson. On February 17, 2017, it was announced that Corin Hardy had signed on to direct The Nun with a new screenplay from Wan and Gary Dauberman. During the filming of Annabelle: Creation, Safran revealed that The Nun would chronologically come first in the Conjuring Universe, making it a further prequel to The Conjuring series and Annabelle series. He said, "We have a board that we created that has what we hope will ultimately be our series of movies. We have it in chronological order, so we can keep track of where it all happens."

Casting
On April 5, 2017, Demián Bichir was cast in the film, as a priest investigating a nun's mysterious suicide. Taissa Farmiga was cast shortly after, as a Roman Catholic nun in her novitiate. Corin Hardy later said that he initially did not want to cast Farmiga due to her being the sister of The Conjuring star Vera Farmiga, but changed his mind when he saw her auditions, "I watched 100 auditions for this role and she had some kind of presence outside of her own body that is evident, and she's phenomenal." Bonnie Aarons was then set to reprise her role as the "Demon Nun" character Valak from The Conjuring 2. Charlotte Hope, Jonas Bloquet, and Ingrid Bisu were subsequently announced to star, rounding out the main cast.

Filming
Principal photography for the film began on May 3, 2017, at Castel Film Studios in Bucharest, Romania, with Maxime Alexandre serving as cinematographer. Film director Corin Hardy had a Roman Catholic priest bless the set prior to filming. Scenes were filmed in the Palace of the Parliament building in June, for a fee of €5,000 per hour. Filming also took place at the Corvin Castle in Hunedoara and in Sighișoara, Transylvania. Hardy saw a handprint in the dust while filming in Mogoșoaia, which he believed to be that of a ghost. Hardy announced on his social media accounts that production had wrapped on June 23, 2017, after 38 days.

Post-production
The Nun reportedly went under extensive reshoots. The Curse of La Llorona cinematographer Michael Burgess had worked on the film. Wan also worked as a second unit director under Hardy.

Music
The original musical score for The Nun was composed by Abel Korzeniowski, and was released on August 31, 2018, by WaterTower Music.

Marketing
On June 13, 2018, a teaser trailer was released. In August 2018, a short advertisement for the film was removed from YouTube due to an unskippable jump scare that violated the platform's "Shocking Content" policies. The studio spent an estimated $90million on prints and advertisements for the film.

Release
Warner Bros. Pictures had initially scheduled The Nun to be released in the United States on July 13, 2018. In February 2018, it was announced that the film's release date would be pushed back to September 7, 2018. The film was released on Digital HD on November 20, 2018, and on Blu-ray and DVD on December 4, 2018. On May 31, 2022, it was released alongside other The Conjuring Universe movies in Blu-ray, excluding The Curse of Llorona.

Reception

Box office
The Nun grossed $117.5million in the United States and Canada, and $248.1million in other territories, for a total worldwide gross of $365.6million, against a production budget of $22million, becoming the highest-grossing film in the franchise. Deadline Hollywood calculated the net profit of the film to be $155million, when factoring together all expenses and revenues.

In the United States and Canada, The Nun was released alongside Peppermint and God Bless the Broken Road, and was originally projected to gross $32–37million in its opening weekend. By the week of its release, forecasts had been increased to $36–45million from 3,876 theaters. It made $22.4million on its first day, including $5.4million from Thursday night previews, both the highest such numbers for The Conjuring films. It went on to debut to $53.8million, also marking the best figure of the franchise, and became the first film in almost a month to finish ahead of Crazy Rich Asians at the box office.

In other territories, it currently ranks as the highest-grossing horror film of all time in twelve markets, including the Philippines (where it has grossed $5million in its first week), Indonesia, Brazil, Romania and UAE.

Critical response
The site's critical consensus reads, "The Nun boasts strong performances, spooky atmospherics, and a couple decent set-pieces, but its sins include inconsistent logic and narrative slackness." On Metacritic, the film has a weighted average score of 46 out of 100, based on 32 critics, indicating "mixed or average reviews". Audiences polled by CinemaScore gave the film an average grade of "C" on an A+ to F scale, the lowest of the series.

Several reviewers criticized a lack of consistent narrative logic. Donald Clarke of The Irish Times wrote, "To compare it to a ghost train would be to understate the narrative cohesion that habitually governs those seaside entertainments." Matthew Rozsa for Salon said, "By overly relying on jump scares, The Nun uses a mechanical approach toward instilling fear rather than a more profound understanding of terror." Writing for the A.V. Club, Katie Rife compared it to Gothic horror by Mario Bava and Hammer Films, praising the "giddiness" but criticizing the "heavy-handed" exposition and lack of suspense.

The Plugged In review for the film summarized the spirituality evident in the film: "Evil is real, the movie tells us, but so is God. Spiritual trappings are everywhere. And when in doubt or danger, you can't go wrong with a little prayer." In her review of the film published in the National Catholic Reporter, Sr. Rose Pacatte, a nun belonging to the Daughters of St. Paul, stated "that there are two Catholic theological aspects of this film that are accurate: one is that the devil exists, and the other is that Mary, the Mother of Jesus, will show us the way." Another religious sister, Nicole Reich, stated in her review of the film published on Syfy Wire that if Valak was a real demon, he would never be able to reveal himself while the "sisters were in perpetual adoration ... because the Lord was present".

Accolades
Sharon Gilham was nominated at the 2018 Fright Meter Awards for Best Costume Design for this film.
The film won at the 2019 Golden Trailer Awards for Best Horror Poster.

Sequel

In August 2017, Wan discussed the possibility of a Nun sequel and what its storyline might entail: "I do know where potentially, if The Nun works out, where The Nun 2 could lead to and how that ties back to Lorraine's story that we've set up with the first two Conjurings and make it all come full circle."

In April 2019, it was announced by Peter Safran that a sequel was in development. He stated there was a "really fun" storyline planned for the film, and commented that there was an "inevitability to another The Nun movie". Later that month, Akela Cooper signed onto the project as screenwriter, while Safran and James Wan will serve as producers.

On April 26, 2022, Warner Bros. Pictures officially announced the movie as a part of its upcoming slate at the 2022 CinemaCon. The following day, it was announced that Michael Chaves will direct the film. Principal photography began on April 29, 2022. Bonnie Aarons was confirmed to be reprising her role as Valak.

References

External links

2018 films
2018 horror films
2010s ghost films
2010s monster movies
American monster movies
American ghost films
American supernatural horror films
The Conjuring Universe
2010s English-language films
Demons in film
Films about Catholic nuns
Films about exorcism
Films produced by James Wan
Films produced by Peter Safran
Films set in London
Films set in Transylvania
Films set in 1952
Films set in 1971
Films shot in Bucharest
Films shot in Romania
Film spin-offs
Gothic horror films
Prequel films
IMAX films
New Line Cinema films
Religious horror films
Films with screenplays by Gary Dauberman
Films with screenplays by James Wan
Warner Bros. films
2010s American films
American prequel films